Pharr Events Center (presently known as the Boggus Ford Events Center) is a 2,500-seat indoor arena located in Pharr, Texas.  It is used primarily for boxing and wrestling, but is also used as a concert venue, with standing room bringing the capacity to 3,500.  There is parking for 600 cars, plus a 60-by-35-foot performance stage.  It was originally built as a convention center.

External links
 Official website

Indoor arenas in Texas
Sports venues in Texas
Buildings and structures in Hidalgo County, Texas